W.H. Smith Hardware Company Building, also known as the Oil and Gas Museum of the Oil, Gas and Industrial Historical Association, is a historic commercial building located at Parkersburg, Wood County, West Virginia. It was built in 1899, on the foundation of a building built about 1874.  It is a four-story, masonry building with Romanesque Revival architectural details.  The rectangular building measure 60 feet by 120 feet, with an 18 feet by 12 feet outcrop.  It housed the W.H. Smith Hardware Company until the 1980s.  It now houses the Oil and Gas Museum.

It was listed on the National Register of Historic Places in 2003.

See also
 List of petroleum museums

References

External links
Oil and Gas Museum website

History museums in West Virginia
Buildings and structures in Parkersburg, West Virginia
Commercial buildings on the National Register of Historic Places in West Virginia
Romanesque Revival architecture in West Virginia
Commercial buildings completed in 1899
Museums in Wood County, West Virginia
National Register of Historic Places in Wood County, West Virginia
1899 establishments in West Virginia